Castle Mead Radio is a hospital radio station broadcasting to Hinckley and Sunnyside Hospitals in Hinckley, Leicestershire, England. It provides music, talk and entertainment to staff, patients and visitors. It has been broadcasting since late 1990. In 2011 to mark its 21st birthday began broadcasting on the internet.

References

*
*
*
*

External links
 Official website

Hospital radio stations
Radio stations established in 1990
Radio stations in Leicestershire
1990 establishments in England
Hinckley